Arkady Isaakovich Raikin (– 17 December 1987) was a Soviet stand-up comedian, theater and film actor, and stage director. He led the school of Soviet and Russian humorists for about half a century.

Biography
Raikin was born into a Jewish family in Riga, in the Governorate of Livonia of the Russian Empire (present-day Latvia). He graduated from the Leningrad Theatrical Technicum in 1935 and worked in both state theatres and variety shows. In 1939, he founded his own theatre in Leningrad, where he used skits and impersonations to ridicule the inefficiency of Communist bureaucracy and the Soviet way of life.  He also appeared in several comedies during and after the Great Patriotic War.

Raikin created an array of popular satirical characters, some of which were featured in the TV serial People and Mannequins. He launched careers of several other prominent stand-up comedians, such as Mikhail Zhvanetsky and Roman Kartsev.

Raikin is often compared with Charlie Chaplin. His fame in the Soviet Union, and throughout Central and Eastern Europe, was such that he was invited to participate in the opening night of BBC Two television in 1964, although the broadcast had to be postponed for one day due to a power failure. His trip to London for the BBC broadcast—during which he was reunited with his British cousin, distinguished pianist Bruno Raikin—marked the first of only two times when the Soviet government permitted him to perform in the West. Arkady Raikin also maintained good working relationships with Marcel Marceau and some other foreign actors.

Three years before his death, Raikin finally moved to Moscow, where he opened the Satyricon Theatre, now run by his son Konstantin Raikin, also an acclaimed actor. His wife, Roma, played a major role in guiding his career, and his daughter, Ekaterina, also had a successful career as a Moscow actress. For a month during the summer of 1987, Raikin hosted his American cousin, Washington D.C. attorney Steven Raikin, as a guest in his Moscow flat. In September 1987 the Soviet Ministry of Culture finally permitted Raikin to visit the United States, where, with his son and daughter, he gave emotional farewell performances in several cities to adoring audiences of Russian émigrés.

Awards
Raikin was awarded the title of People's Artist of the USSR in 1968, the Lenin Prize in 1980, and the Hero of Socialist Labour award in 1981. A minor planet 4518 Raikin discovered on 1 April 1976, is named after him.

Filmography

Actor
 1938 — "Огненные годы" (Fiery Years)
 1939 — "Доктор Калюжный" (Doctor Kalyuzhnyy)
 1942 — "Концерт фронту" (Concert for the Front)
 1954 — "Мы с Вами где-то встречались" (Did We Meet Somewhere Before)
 1964 — "Когда песня не кончается" (When the Song Does Not End)
 1970 — "Волшебная сила искусства" (Magic Power of Art)
 1974 — "Люди и манекены" (People and Mannequins)

 Director and screenplay
 1974 — "Люди и манекены" (People and Mannequins)
 1987 — "Peace to your home"

References

Sources

External links

 Entry on Raikin in the 2004 Britannica
 Arkadi Rajkin: Able to Make People Laugh in Non-Laughable Times
  Memoirs, recordings (mp3), Photogallery

1911 births
1987 deaths
Actors from Riga
People from the Governorate of Livonia
Latvian Jews
Soviet male actors
Jewish Russian comedians
Heroes of Socialist Labour
People's Artists of the USSR
Burials at Novodevichy Cemetery
Russian parodists
Theatre people from Riga